This is a list of England Test cricketers. A Test match is an international two-innings per side cricket match between two of the leading cricketing nations. The list is arranged in the order in which each player won his Test cap by playing for the England cricket team. Where more than one player won his first Test cap in the same Test match, those players are listed alphabetically by surname. In the text, the numbers that follow the players' names correspond to their place in the chronological list of English Test cricketers. Current players have their chronological number on the front of their shirts.

Statistics are correct as of 28 February 2023, after England's tour of New Zealand.

Key

Early years: 1877–1889

The early years of Test cricket saw a number of tours to Australia. Most of these tours were professional in nature, and as the sea voyage was around 42 days and the tours lasted many months, the sides were selected as much on availability as on cricketing aptitude. As a result of this, coupled with there only being a small number of Tests being played, there are many early cricketers with Test records of only a few matches. The key players who had their Test debut during this period include the great professional all-rounders George Ulyett (11), who played 25 Tests, and Billy Barnes (21), who played 21. England's Champion cricketer WG Grace (24) first played Test cricket in 1880. Although Test match cricket had not been invented in his heyday of the late 1860s and 1870s, he continued playing into his fifties, finally retiring from Test cricket at the turn of the century. Shrewsbury (35) and Stoddart (56) go down amongst the great captains of the period, as well as two of the many cricketing suicides. Johnny Briggs (47), who, bedevilled by mental illness, died young, notched up the most Test caps of the earliest era of Test match cricket.

Golden Age: 1890–1914

The period between 1890 and immediately before the First World War is known as the Golden Age of cricket. It saw great amateur players such as CB Fry (95), the Indian Prince Ranjitsinhji (105) and captains Stanley Jackson (82), Archie MacLaren (92) and Plum Warner (118) as the leading lights in an era eulogised by Neville Cardus and others. In reality, it was not quite the great age of the amateur related in Cardus's writings. Sydney Barnes (129) became the best paid cricketer by spurning county cricket to play in the Lancashire leagues. However, the sheer volume of greats, that include Jack Hobbs (157), Tom Hayward (97), Gilbert Jessop (122) and Wilfred Rhodes (121) means that the age retains a fond place in the memory of England's cricket fans. It was also an era in which Bernard Bosanquet (137) invented the googly and Tip Foster (138) became the only man to captain England at both cricket and football, and Rhodes, at 30 years, 10 months and 11 days, had the longest spanning Test career of all.

Inter-war years: 1919–1939

Post-war years: 1946–1959

1960s

1970s

1980s

1990s

2000s

2010s

2020s

Shirt number history
Since the 2019 Ashes series, there has been an introduction of names and numbers on all Test players' shirts in an effort to engage new fans and help identify the players. This forms part of the inaugural ICC World Test Championship, a league competition between the top nine Test nations spread over a two-year period, culminating in a Final between the top two teams.

Notes

References

Test cricketers
England